In a warship an armored citadel is an armored box enclosing the machinery and magazine spaces formed by the armored deck, the waterline belt, and the transverse bulkheads. In many post-World War I warships, armor was concentrated in a very strong citadel, with the rest of the ship virtually unprotected, which was found to be the most effective defence; this is referred to as all or nothing armor.

In a non-military ship a citadel is a secure space equipped with means of communication and emergency supplies, used typically in case of piracy.

Citations

Bibliography
 

Ship compartments
Naval armour